Pfeffer is a German surname meaning "pepper" and may refer to:

 Anna Pfeffer (born 1946), Hungarian Olympic medalist sprint canoer
 Anshel Pfeffer, British journalist
 Anton Pfeffer (born 1965), Austrian footballer
 Big Jeff Pfeffer (1882–1954), Major League pitcher (not to be confused with his brother Jeff Pfeffer)
 Camilla Pfeffer (born 1993), German gymnast
 David Pfeffer (born 1982), German singer
 Franz Pfeffer von Salomon (1888–1968), German first commander of the SA
 Fred Pfeffer (1860–1932), American baseball player
 Fritz Pfeffer (1889–1944), Nazi victim
 Georg Johann Pfeffer (1854–1931), German zoologist
 Georg Pfeffer (1943–2020), German anthropologist
 Jack Pfefer (also commonly spelled as "Pfeffer") (1894–1974), professional wrestling promoter
 Jeff Pfeffer (1888–1972), pitcher (not to be confused with his brother Big Jeff Pfeffer)
 Jeffrey Pfeffer, American Professor of Organizational Behavior
 Karl Pfeffer-Wildenbruch (1888–1971) member of the German Waffen-SS
 Kirk Pfeffer (born 1956), American Marathon runner
 Lachlan Pfeffer (born 1991), Australian cricketer
 Leo Pfeffer, (1910–1993), American legal scholar re: separation of church and state
 Max Pfeffer (1883–1955), general in the Wehrmacht of Nazi Germany
 Nicolai Pfeffer (born 1985), German clarinettist
 Ori Pfeffer, Israeli actor
 Pierre Pfeffer, (1927–2016), French zoologist and conservationist
 Thomas Pfeffer (born 1957), German sport shooter
 Sascha Pfeffer (born 1986), German footballer
 Susan Beth Pfeffer (born 1948), American author best known for young adult science fiction
 Washek Pfeffer (born 1936), Czech/US mathematician
 Wilhelm Pfeffer (1845–1920), German botanist
 Zach Pfeffer (born 1995), American soccer player

See also 
 Pfeiffer (disambiguation)

German-language surnames